Diversi Musical Products, Inc is a manufacturer of electric organs. It specializes in making clones of the Hammond organ and became popular when jazz organists "Papa" John and Joey DeFrancesco "defected" from Hammond to using their organs instead.

History
The company was formed by former Hammond-Suzuki Northeast Regional Sales Rep and Marketing Services Manager, Tom Tuson, who had been impressed by a drawbar MIDI module manufactured by Voce, which used physical modelling instead of samples. He became friends with Voce's Dave Amels, and the two decided to collaborate on a project to create their own organ. They came up with the Diversi DV, which earned immediate critical acclaim for its accuracy. In an interview with Keyboard magazine, Don Bosco said the DV "feels to me exactly how a vintage Hammond would have when it was new."

The company received a major boost when Joey DeFrancesco, self-described as "the finest jazz organist on the planet", publicly announced he had "defected from Hammond" and was now actively endorsing Diversi and owning a stake in the business. His 2008 album Joey D! was recorded entirely on a Diversi, with sleeve note author Michael G Nastos declaring that "the instrument DeFrancesco plays acts and sounds like an organ, if possible with a richer, deeper tone, especially in the bass foot pedals.” His father, Papa John DeFrancesco also used the Diversi to record Big Shot.

Tom Tuson has made a specific point in interviews, that Diversi could offer a more affordable drawbar organ with a better sound engine alternative than Hammond Suzuki's "New B3," while being at a lower price and including a built-in Leslie speaker simulator. Though he once, like many organists, thought the Hammond and Leslie were inseparable, he now thinks the simulation on the Diversi is so good that "I don't care if I ever see another Leslie in my life".

Diversi sponsors the Bobby Jones Gospel on the B.E.T. Network and has provided equipment for the show since 2003.

References

Books

 

American musical instrument makers
Companies established in 2003
Electronic organ manufacturing companies